William Bernard Seiling (May 28, 1864 – January 6, 1951) was an American tug of war athlete who competed in the 1904 Summer Olympics. He was born in St. Louis, Missouri and died in Rural-Meramec. In the 1904 Olympics he won a silver medal as a member of Southwest Turnverein of Saint Louis No. 1 team.

References

External links
profile 

1864 births
1951 deaths
Olympic tug of war competitors of the United States
Tug of war competitors at the 1904 Summer Olympics
Olympic silver medalists for the United States in tug of war
Medalists at the 1904 Summer Olympics